Killyman St Mary's is a Gaelic Athletic Association (GAC) based in the parish of Dungannon in County Tyrone, Northern Ireland.

History
The club was established in 1964.

Achievements
 Tyrone Intermediate Football Championship 
 1973, 2007
 Tyrone Junior Football Championship 
 1968, 1989, 2005, 2010

References

Gaelic games clubs in County Tyrone
Gaelic football clubs in County Tyrone